The Caledonia Senate District is one of 16 districts of the Vermont Senate. The current district plan is included in the redistricting and reapportionment plan developed by the Vermont General Assembly following the 2020 U.S. Census, which applies to legislatures elected in 2022, 2024, 2026, 2028, and 2030.

The Caledonia district includes most of Caledonia County, and the Town of Newbury from Orange County.

As of the 2020 census, the state as a whole had a population of 643,077. As there are a total of 30 Senators, there were 21,436 residents per senator.

As of the 2010 census, the state as a whole had a population of 625,741. As there are a total of 30 senators, there were 20,858 residents per senator. 

As of the 2000 census, the state as a whole had a population of 608,827. As there are a total of 30 Senators, there were 20,294 residents per senator.  The Caledonia District had a population of 38,076 in that same census.  The district is apportioned two senators.  This equals 19,038 residents per senator, 6.19% below the state average.

District Senators

As of 2023
Jane Kitchel, Democrat
As of 2010
 Joe Benning, Republican
 Jane Kitchel, Democrat

Towns in the Caledonia district

Caledonia County 
Barnet
Danville
Groton
Hardwick
Peacham
Ryegate
St. Johnsbury
Stannard
Walden
Waterford
Wheelock

Orange County
Newbury

See also
Vermont Senate districts, 2012–2022
Vermont Senate districts, 2022–2032

References

External links

 Redistricting information from Vermont Legislature
 Map of current Caledonia County Senate district
 2002 and 2012 Redistricting information from Vermont Legislature
 Map of Vermont Senate districts and statistics (PDF) 2002–2012

Vermont Senate districts